Gybe may refer to:

 Gybe, an alternative spelling of jibe, a sailing maneuver
 Chinese gybe, a type of jibe
 Godspeed You! Black Emperor, a Canadian post-rock band, commonly abbreviated to GY!BE
 God Speed You! Black Emperor, a Japanese motorcycle film that gave the band their name.